Indotriplophysa is a subgenus of the stone loach genus Triplophysa native to central Asia. It is regarded by some authorities as a valid genus in its own right.

Species
There are currently four recognized species in this subgenus:
 Triplophysa (Indotriplophysa) choprai (Hora), 1934  
 Triplophysa (Indotriplophysa) crassicauda  (Herzenstein, 1888)
 Triplophysa (Indotriplophysa) eugeniae (Prokofiev, 2002)
 Triplophysa (Indotriplophysa) yasinensis (Alcock, 1898)

References

Nemacheilidae
Animal subgenera